is a former Japanese football player.

Playing career
Matsuyama was born in Sapporo on January 11, 1974. After graduating from Shizuoka Gakuen High School, he joined Japan Football League (JFL) club Fujita Industries (later Bellmare Hiratsuka) in 1993. The club won the champions in 1993 and was promoted to J1 League. Although he played several matches as midfielder every season, he could not play many matches. In 1996, he moved to JFL club Consadole Sapporo. However he could not play at all in the match and he retired end of 1996 season.

Club statistics

References

External links

1974 births
Living people
Association football people from Hokkaido
Japanese footballers
J1 League players
Japan Football League (1992–1998) players
Shonan Bellmare players
Hokkaido Consadole Sapporo players
Association football midfielders
Sportspeople from Sapporo